Cliff Mardulier (born 22 September 1982) is a Belgian former professional footballer who played as a goalkeeper.

External links
 
 

1982 births
Living people
People from Edegem
Belgian footballers
Association football goalkeepers
Belgium youth international footballers
Belgium under-21 international footballers
Eredivisie players
Eerste Divisie players
Belgian Pro League players
Lierse S.K. players
Roda JC Kerkrade players
MVV Maastricht players
Belgian expatriate footballers
Belgian expatriate sportspeople in the Netherlands
Expatriate footballers in the Netherlands
Footballers from Antwerp Province